Ambalavasi, more properly Ampalavasi, (IAST: Ampalavāsi) is the generic name for a group of castes among Hindus in Kerala, India, who have traditionally rendered temple services.

Castes

The Ambalavasis are broadly divided into two groups, being those who wear the sacred thread and those who do not.

Sacred thread wearers

Pushpaka Brahmins

 Pushpaka (Pushpakan Unni)
 Nambeesan
 Theeyatt Unni
 Kurukkal
 Puppalli
 Plappalli (Pilappalli)
 Nambidi
 Daivampadi or Brahmani

Others
 Chakyar, 
 Nambiar
 Atikal (also written as Adikal)

Threadless Ambalavasis
Pisharody
Marar 
Varyar
Pothuval,

The feminine names of threadless ambalavasi castes are formed by adding the suffix -syar to the masculine names as Pisharadi-Pisharasyar, Marar-Marasyar, Variar-Varasyar, Poduval-Poduvalsyar.

Temple services

Though all Ampalavāsis have to do service in temples, they have sufficiently distinct functions to perform.  Pushpakans and Nambeesans are teachers in the Pathasalas or Mutts and suppliers of flowers to temple.  Chakyar stages dramas called Kooth and Koodiyattam.  Marars are temple musicians.  Variar and Poduval did managerial and executive functions of temple committees and served as storekeepers and watchmen.

Customs

The customs of Ambalavasis vary according to castes. Ambalavasis are generally vegetarians.  Some Ambalavasi castes are patrilineal, while the others are matrilineal.  

Their ritual rank in Hinduism is highly disputed.  Ambalavasi castes who wear Sacred Thread and adhere Vedic rituals are classified as Brahmins or as lower rung of Brahmins.  Some castes are classified as intermediate class between Brahmins and Kshatriyas while some other castes are classified as intermediate class between Brahmins and Kshatriyas (Nairs).  So they were called as antharala jathikal (intermediate castes).

Kazhakams
Kazhakams or Ambalakkazhakams refer to associations of ambalavasi peoples in a temple to perform specific duties in the temple.

Temple arts

Traditionally, Ambalavasis are associated with various types of temple arts.  Earlier, each of these temple arts were performed only by specific Ambalavasi castes. Now there is no community or caste barrier.

Community welfare

Various service organizations are in operation for the welfare of various castes or groups in the Ambalavasi Community. 
 
 Sree Pushpakabrahmana Seva Sangham is working for the welfare of Pushpaka Brahmins comprising Pushpaka Unnis, Theeyattunnis, Nambeesans, Kurukkal, Puppalli, Pilappalli, Brahmani-daivampadi etc. Its headquarters is in Thiruvananthapuram, Kerala. Sangham publishes a monthly magazine called 'Pushpakadhwani'.
 Chakyar-Nambiar Samajam is working for the welfare of Chakyars and Nambiars.  Its headquarters is at Kochi, Ernakuklam, Kerala. The Nambiar samajam publishes a magazine called 'Mizhavu'.  
 Pisharody Samajam with its headquarters at Ayyanthole, Thrissur, Kerala.  Pisharody samajam brings out a magazine named 'Thulaseedalam'. 
 Warrier Samajam with its headquarters at Guruvayur, Thrissur, Kerala.  Warrier samajam publishes a monthly magazine called 'Theertham' to convey its various activities to its members.
 Akhila Kerala Marar Kshema Sabha is working for the welfare of Marars. Its headquarters is at Thrissur.  Marar Kshema Sabha publishes a magazine called 'Sopanadhwani'. 
 Poduval Samajam with its headquarters at Vellinezhi, Palakkad, Kerala.  Poduval samajam publishes a quarterly magazine called 'Nirmalyam'.

See also
 Pushpaka Brahmin
 Koodiyattam

References

Social groups of Kerala
Liturgical castes